Amtrak's 25 Hz traction power system is a traction power grid operated by Amtrak along the southern portion of its Northeast Corridor (NEC): the 226.6 route miles (362 km) between Washington, D.C. and New York City and the 104 route miles (167 km) between Philadelphia and Harrisburg, Pennsylvania. The Pennsylvania Railroad constructed it between 1915 and 1938. Amtrak inherited the system from Penn Central, the successor to the Pennsylvania Railroad, in 1976, along with the Northeast Corridor. This is the reason for using 25 Hz, as opposed to 60 Hz, which is the standard for power transmission in North America. In addition to serving the NEC, the system provides power to NJ Transit Rail Operations (NJT), the Southeastern Pennsylvania Transportation Authority (SEPTA) and the Maryland Area Regional Commuter Train (MARC). Only about half of the system's electrical capacity is used by Amtrak. The remainder is sold to the commuter railroads who operate their trains along the corridor.

History

The Pennsylvania Railroad (PRR) began experimenting with electric traction in 1910, coincident with their completion of the trans-Hudson tunnels and New York Penn Station. These initial systems were low-voltage direct current (DC) third rail systems. While they performed adequately for tunnel service, the PRR ultimately determined them to be inadequate for long distance, high-speed electrification.

Other railroads had by this time experimented with low frequency (less than 60 Hz) alternating current (AC) systems. These low-frequency systems had the AC advantage of higher transmission voltages, reducing resistive losses over long distances, as well as the typically DC advantage of easy motor control as universal motors could be employed with transformer tap changer control gear. Pantograph contact with trolley wire is also more tolerant of high speeds and variations in track geometry. The New York, New Haven and Hartford Railroad had already electrified a portion of its Main Line in 1908 at 11 kV 25 Hz AC and this served as a template for the PRR, which installed its own trial main line electrification between Philadelphia and Paoli, Pennsylvania in 1915. Power was transmitted along the tops of the catenary supports using four single phase, 2 wire 44 kV distribution circuits. Tests on the line using experimental electric locomotives such as the PRR FF1 revealed that the 44 kV distribution lines would be insufficient for heavier loads over longer distances.

In the 1920s the PRR decided to electrify major portions of its eastern rail network, and because a commercial electric grid did not exist at the time, the railroad constructed its own distribution system to transmit power from generating sites to trains, possibly hundreds of miles distant. To accomplish this the PRR implemented a pioneering system of single-phase high voltage transmission lines at 132 kV, stepped down to the 11 kV at regularly spaced substations along the tracks.

The first line to be electrified using this new system was between Philadelphia and Wilmington, Delaware in the late 1920s. By 1930, catenary extended from Philadelphia to Trenton, New Jersey, by 1933 to New York City, and by 1935 south to Washington, D.C. Finally, in 1939, the main line from Paoli west to Harrisburg was completed along with several freight-only lines. Also included were the Trenton Cutoff and the Port Road Branch. Superimposed on these electrified lines was an independent power grid delivering 25 Hz current from the point of generation to electric locomotives anywhere on nearly 500 route miles (800 km) of track, all under the control of electric power dispatchers in Harrisburg, Baltimore, Philadelphia and New York City.

Northeast railroads atrophied in the years following World War II; the PRR was no exception. The infrastructure of the northeast corridor remained essentially unchanged through the series of mergers and bankruptcies which ended in Amtrak's creation and acquisition of the former PRR lines which came to be known as the Northeast Corridor. The circa 1976 Northeast Corridor Improvement Project had originally planned to convert the PRR's system to the utility grid standard of 60 Hz. Ultimately, this plan was shelved as economically unfeasible and the electrical traction infrastructure was left largely unchanged with the exception of a general traction power voltage increase to 12 kV and a corresponding transmission voltage increase to 138 kV.

During the 1970s, several of the original converter or power stations which originally supplied power to the system were shut down. Also, the end of electrified through-freight service on the Main Line to Paoli allowed the original 1915 substations and their 44 kV distribution lines to be decommissioned with that  section of track being fed from 1930s-era substations on either end. In the decade between 1992 and 2002, several static converter stations were commissioned to replace stations that had or were being shut down. Jericho Park, Richmond, and Sunnyside Yard converters were all installed during this period. This replaced much of the electrical frequency conversion equipment, but the lineside transmission and distribution equipment were unchanged.

In 2003, Amtrak commenced a capital improvement plan that involved planned replacement of much of the lineside network, including 138/12 kV transformers, circuit breakers, and catenary wire. Statistically, this capital improvement has resulted in significantly fewer delays, although dramatic system shutdowns have still occurred.

Specifications and statistics

The 25 Hz system was built by the Pennsylvania Railroad with a nominal voltage of 11.0 kV. The nominal operating voltages were raised in 1948 and are now:

 Catenary (Traction) Voltage : 12.0 kV
 Transmission Voltage: 138 kV
 Signal Power:
 2.2 kV 91⅔ Hz – NY Penn Area. 60 Hz used 1910–1931. 100 Hz installed but quickly changed to avoid interference caused by simultaneous AC and DC electrification.
 3.3 kV 100 Hz – Paoli/Chestnut Hill. 60 Hz used 1915/18–1930.
 6.9 kV 91⅔ Hz – all electrification work from 1930 onward.

As of 1997, the system included:
  of 138 kV transmission line,
 55 substations,
 147 transformers, and
 1104 miles of 12 kV catenary.

Over 550 GWh of energy are consumed annually by locomotives on the system. If this were consumed at a constant rate over the entire year (although it is not in practice), the average system load would be approximately 63 MW.

The system power factor varies between 0.75 and around 0.85.

Power sources

Electrical power originates at seven generation or conversion facilities. The nameplate capacity of all the power sources in the system is about 354 MW. The instantaneous peak loading on the system is 210–220 MW (as of  2009) during the morning rush hour, and up to 225 MW during afternoon. Peak load has risen significantly in the last decade – in 1997 the peak load was 148 MW. As a point of comparison, an HHP-8 electric locomotive is rated for a 6 MW (equivalent to 8,000 hp) mechanical output, after conversion and head end power losses.

Regardless of the source, all converter and generator plants supply power to the transmission system at 138 kV, 25 Hz, single phase, using two wires. Typically at least two separate 138 kV circuits follow each right of way to supply the lineside substations.

Currently, the following converter and generating plants are operable, although all are rarely in operation simultaneously due to maintenance shutdowns and overhaul:

Several types of equipment are currently in operation: static inverters, motor-generators (sometimes called rotary frequency converters), water turbines (hydroelectric generators) and a static cycloconverter.

Hydroelectric generators

 Safe Harbor Dam, PA – The Safe Harbor Dam has two 28 MW, single phase, turbines dedicated to 25 Hz power generation. A 25 MW bi-directional motor generator type frequency converter is also installed. The total 25 Hz capacity of the dam is 81 MW. Power from Safe Harbor is transmitted via the Conestoga substation to Royalton, Pennsylvania, Parkesburg, Pennsylvania (two circuits), and Perryville, Maryland (four circuits) where it is fed into the lineside 138 kV network.

The 25 Hz machines at the dam are scheduled by Amtrak but owned and operated by Safe Harbor Water Power Company. Like other hydroelectric plants, it also has excellent black start capability. This was most recently demonstrated during the 2006 blackout. After a cascade shutdown of converters had left the network de-energized, it was recovered using Safe Harbor's generators, and the other converters subsequently brought back online.

During the twelve-month period ending August 2009, Safe Harbor supplied about 133 GWh of energy to the Amtrak substation at Perryville. Typically, two thirds of the Safe Harbor output is routed through Perryville, the remainder being sent through Harrisburg or Parkesburg. This suggests that Safe Harbor supplies around 200 GWh of energy annually into the 25 Hz network.

Motor-generators (rotary frequency converters)
Motor-generators and steam turbine generators were the original power sources on the PRR traction power network. The last steam turbine shut down in 1954, but some of the original motor generators remain. Although the converting machines are frequently called 'rotary converters' or 'rotary frequency converters', they are not the rotary converter used frequently by subways to convert low-frequency alternating current to DC power. The converters used are more precisely described as motor generators and consist of two synchronous AC machines on a common shaft with different ratios of poles; they are not electrically connected as in a true rotary converter.

Principal advantages of motor generators include very high fault current ratings and clean output current. Solid state electronics can be damaged very quickly, so the microprocessor control systems react very quickly to over-correct conditions to place the converter in a safe, idle mode; or to trip the output circuit breaker. Motor generators, being of 1930s design, are heavily overbuilt. These rugged machines can absorb large load transients and demanding fault conditions, while continuing to remain online. Their output waveform is also perfectly sinusoidal without noise or higher harmonic output. They can actually absorb harmonic noise produced by solid-state devices, effectively serving as a filter. These attributes, combined with their high fault-current capability, make them desirable in a stabilizing role within the power system. Amtrak has retained two of the original converter plants and plans to overhaul them and continue their operation indefinitely.

Disadvantages of motor generators include lower efficiency, generally between 83% (lightly loaded machine) and 92% (fully loaded machine). In comparison, cycloconverter efficiency can exceed 95%. Also, motor generators require more routine maintenance due their nature as rotating machines, given the bearings and slip rings. Today, the outright replacement of motor generators would also be difficult due to the high manufacturing cost and limited demand for these large 25 Hz machines.

Metuchen, NJ – 25 MW Motor Generator. Upgrades to transmission lines and circuit breakers are planned for 2010. 
Lamokin (Chester), Pennsylvania – The Lamokin plant was built in the 1920s and has a net capacity of 48 MW and consists of three 16 MW motor generators. All three units will be overhauled, including re-winding of rotors and stators, and replacement of slip ring assemblies. Associated breakers and cables are also planned for replacement.

Static inverters and cycloconverter
The static converters in the system were commissioned during the decade between 1992 and around 2002. Static converters use high-power solid-state electronics, with few moving parts. Chief advantages of static converters over motor generators include lower capital cost, lower operating costs, and higher conversion efficiency. The Jericho Park converter exceeds its efficiency design criteria of 95%. Major disadvantages of solid state converters include harmonic frequency generation on both the 25 Hz and 60 Hz sides, and lower overload capability.

 Sunnyside Yard (Long Island City), NY – Static Inverter rated at 30 MW ordered from ABB in 1993 for $27 million. This converter is operated by Amtrak and generally runs at low continuous loading to provide peaking and reactive power support to the New York area. 
 Richmond (Philadelphia), PA – The Richmond Static Converter plant consists of five 36 MW modules and has a net capacity of 180 MW. It was ordered from Siemens in 1999 for $60 million and installation was completed around 2002. The plant receives 69 kV, three phase, 60 Hz power from the PECO Energy Company. Although the exact electrical architecture of the converter modules is unknown, they are presumably of the DC link variety (Rectifier, filtering capacity, and inverter placed back to back) based on other Siemens traction power converters. The 2006 traction network shutdown originated in one of the converter modules at this plant. Richmond output power is scheduled with PECO, although the units themselves are operated by Amtrak remotely from Philadelphia. Generally, the three PECO-supplied converters (Richmond, Metuchen, and Lamokin) are scheduled as a block with PECO. 
 Jericho Park, MD – 20 MW Static Converter. Jericho Park was constructed to replace the capacity lost when BG&E declined to renew the Benning rotary converter contract. BG&E proposed a static converter to replace Benning and Jericho Park came on service six years later. It consists of two 10 MW cycloconverter modules supplied by GE.  Jericho Park was the first solid-state power supply introduced on the Amtrak network. It suffered from some filtering network problems caused by the highly distorted voltage present on the catenary and was ultimately downgraded from its original design capacity of 25 MW to 22 MVA. Amtrak has requested funding to rehabilitate portions of the converter in an ARRA request. During the twelve-month period that ended in August 2009, the Jericho Park converter used about 70 GWh of energy. Note that SEPTA's static converter plant at Wayne Junction is also based on this technology, although it was supplied by a different company; see SEPTA's 25 Hz Traction Power System. 
 Metuchen – In October 2014 Amtrak placed a contract with Siemens for two 30 MW converters to supplement the existing 25MW motor-generator from 1933. The project was completed in 2017 and forms part of the New Jersey High Speed Rail Improvement Program (NJHSRIP).

Former converter and power stations

The majority of power sources in the original Pennsylvania Railroad electrification were built prior to 1940. Some have been retired out-right, others have been replaced with co-located static frequency converters, and others remain in service and will be refurbished and operated indefinitely. The following tables lists sources which are no longer in service.

Declining need for 25 Hz power
During the beginning of the 20th century, 25 Hz power was much more readily available from commercial electrical utilities. The vast majority of urban subway systems used 25 Hz power to supply their lineside rotary converters used to generate the DC voltage supplied to the trains. Since rotary converters work more efficiently with lower frequency supplies, 25 Hz was a common supply frequency for these machines. Rotary converters have been steadily replaced over the past 70 years with, at first, mercury arc rectifiers and more lately solid-state rectifiers. Thus, the need for special frequency power for urban traction has disappeared, along with the financial motivation for utilities to operate generators at these frequencies.

Long Island City Generating Station
Long Island City Power Station in Hunter's Point, NY was built by the Pennsylvania Railroad in 1906 in preparation for the North River Tunnels and the opening of Pennsylvania Station in Manhattan. The station consisted of 64 coal-fired boilers and three steam turbine generators with a total capacity of 16 MW. In 1910, the station was expanded with two additional turbine generators for a total capacity of 32.5 MW. Power was transmitted to rotary converters (AC to DC machines) for use in the PRR's original third rail electrification scheme. Like most DC electric distribution systems of the time (Thomas Edison's being the most famous), 25 Hz power was used to drive rotary converters at substations along the line. Some sources state that the station was largely dormant by the 1920s. When AC overhead electrification was extended in the 1930s, Long Island City connected to the 11 kV catenary distribution system. Operation of the station was transferred to Consolidated Edison in 1938, although ConEd began supplying power from the adjacent Waterside Generating Station, most likely due to declining overall demand for 25 Hz power. The station was disused and sold in the mid-1950s.

Waterside Generating Station
Originally constructed by Consolidated Edison to supply power to their DC distribution system in Manhattan, Waterside began supplying power to the PRR's AC system around 1938 when ConEd assumed operation of the Long Island City Station. The single-phase turbine generators were retired in the mid-1970s due to safety concerns. Two transformers were installed to supply catenary power from remaining (three-phase) portions of ConEd's still relatively extensive 25 Hz system. Power flow management problems prevented usage of this source under other than emergency conditions.

Benning Frequency Changer
In 1986, Baltimore Gas and Electric elected to not renew the contract under which it had operated the Benning Power Station frequency changer on behalf of Amtrak. They proposed a static frequency changer which was built at Jericho Park (Bowie, Maryland) and placed on service in the spring of 1992.

Radnor synchronous condenser
Although reactive power has primarily been supplied along with real power by the steam turbines and motor generators of the system, the PRR briefly used two synchronous condensers. Shortly after commissioning the 1915 electrification, the railroad discovered that the 44 kV feeders and large inductive loads on the system were causing significant voltage sag. The supplying electric utility (Philadelphia Electric) also discovered that power factor correction was needed. This substation was located at the site of water tanks used to supply water to track pans which supplied water to conventional steam locomotives. At some later time, the converters were shut down and removed. Dedicated machines for reactive power support have not been used subsequently by either the PRR or Amtrak.

Substations 

The PRR's original 1915 electrification made use of four substations, at Arsenal Bridge, West Philadelphia, Bryn Mawr, and Paoli. The Arsenal Bridge substation stepped-up 13.2 kV, 25 Hz power supplied from PECO's Schuylkill power station on Christian Street to 44 kV for distribution. The remaining three substations reduced the 44 kV distribution voltage to 11 kV catenary voltage. The substations were operated from adjacent signal towers. They used typical period concrete buildings to house the transformers and switchgear while the line terminals were on the roof. From 1918 onward, outdoor stations were used and when the main line electrification began in 1928 the stations became large open air structures using lattice steel frameworks to mount the 132 kV terminations and switchgear. By 1935 new stations were connected to remote supervision systems allowing power directors to open and close switches and breakers from central offices without having to go through the tower operators.

Today about 55 substations are part of Amtrak's network. Thus the catenary is segmented (via section breaks, also called 'sectionalizations' by the PRR) at each substation, and each substation feeds both sides of a catenary's section break. A train traveling between two substations draws power through both transformers.

A typical substation includes two to four 138/12 kV transformers, 138 kV air switches that permit isolation of individual transformers, shutdown one of the two 138 kV feeders, or cross-connection from one feeder to another. The output of the transformers is routed to the catenary via 12 kV circuit breakers and air disconnect switches. Cross-connect switches allow one transformer to feed all catenary lines.

The PRR substation architecture was based on a long distance, high speed railway. The substation spacing ensures that any train is never more than 4 or 5 miles from the nearest substation, which minimized voltage drop. One disadvantage to the substation design as originally built by the PRR concerns its lack of 138 kV circuit breakers. Essentially all segmentation of the 138 kV system must be manually accomplished, making rapid isolation of a fault on the 138 kV line difficult.

Faults in one part of the line also affect the entire distribution system since it is impossible for the 138 kV transmission system to protect or reconfigure itself during a fault condition. High voltage faults generally are cleared by opening converter output breakers, which causes a concurrent loss of the converter. The system does not degrade gracefully under high voltage faults. Rather than isolating, for example, the south 138 kV feeder between Washington and Perryville, the system would require opening converter output breakers at Jericho Park and Safe Harbor. This results in loss of much more of the network than is required to simply isolate the fault.

Transmission lines

All transmission lines within the 25 Hz system are two-wire, single-phase, 138 kV. The center tap of each 138 kV/12 kV transformer is connected to ground, thus the two transmission lines are tied to ±69 kV with respect to ground and 138 kV relative to each other.

Generally two separate two-wire circuits travel along the rail line between substations. One circuit is mounted at the top of the catenary poles on one side of the track; the second circuit runs along the other side.

The arrangement of catenary supports and transmission wires gives the overhead structure along former Pennsylvania Railroad lines its characteristic -tall 'H'-shaped structure. They are much taller than the overhead electrification structures on other electrified American railroads due to the 138 kV transmission lines. Catenary towers and transmission lines along former New York, New Haven and Hartford Railroad lines and Amtrak's New England division are much shorter, and are recognizable due to different design and construction.

While a majority of the transmission infrastructure is located directly above the rail lines on the same structure that supports the catenary system, some lines are either located above lines that have been de-electrified or abandoned or in a few cases on completely independent rights of way.

The following is a list of all major segments of the 25 Hz 138 kV transmission infrastructure listing substations (SS or Sub) or high-tension switching stations (HT Sw'g) as termini. For clarity, positions of substations are not repeated in this table. A listing of the high-tension switching stations follows.

Recent developments

Amtrak's capital improvement program which began in 2003 has continued to the present day and has since 2009, received added support from economic stimulus funding sources (American Recovery and Reinvestment Act of 2009 or ARRA).

Major improvements in 2010 included:
 Completion of the Ivy City substation and 138 kV transmission line.
 Replace five traction power transformers.
 Renew 40 miles of catenary in Maryland.
 Renew 18 miles of catenary in Pennsylvania.
 Continue catenary renewal along Hell Gate line in New York.
 Replace the 138 kV transmission line between Safe Harbor (Conestoga Substation) and Atglen, PA (just west of Parkesburg, PA).

Major improvements planned for the future include:
 Upgrade the Metuchen frequency converter.
 Construction of a new substation, called Hamilton (Sub 34A), between Morrisville and Princeton.
 Upgrade of the catenary and power system for high-speed operation in New Jersey.

Ivy City substation project

The Ivy City substation project marked the first extension of 138 kV transmission line since Safe Harbor Dam was constructed in 1938. In the original PRR electrification scheme, the 138 kV transmission lines went south from Landover to the Capital South substation rather than following the line through Ivy City to the northern approach to Union Station. The two tracks between Landover and Union Station had no high voltage transmission line above them; Union Station catenary was fed at 12 kV from the Landover and Capitol substations (the latter via the First Street Tunnels). When the Capitol South substation was abandoned, coincident with the de-electrification of the track between Landover and Potomac Yard, Union Station and its approaches became a single-end fed section of track. This combined with rising traffic levels resulted in low voltage conditions on the approaches to Union Station and decreased system reliability.

Since the original catenary supports along this section of track were only high enough for the 12 kV catenary wire, the 138 kV lines were installed on new steel monopod poles installed along the right-of-way. Except for the fact that the new poles only carry four conductors rather than the typical six for a utility line, the new line appears as a typical medium voltage power line rather than the typical PRR style H-shaped structure.

Conestoga to Atglen transmission line
In 2011, Amtrak replaced the transmission lines that tie the Conestoga Substation to Parkesburg via Atglen. These lines were originally installed over the Atglen and Susquehanna Branch. The line was subsequently abandoned by Conrail and the tracks removed, but Amtrak has retained an easement to operate its 138 kV transmission lines over the roadbed. The scope of work included:
 Original portal and cantilever catenary support (~450 structures) removal.
 Installation of 257 new monopole structures.
  of ACSR transmission conductor installation (two circuits, two wires each).
  of fiberoptic ground line.
Funding for this project was included under the ARRA program.

Zoo to Paoli transmission line

In late 2010, Amtrak solicited design services for new transmission lines between Paoli and Zoo substations. Primary objectives of this expansion include improving reliability of transmission between Safe Harbor and Philadelphia, and reducing maintenance costs. This project complements the Safe Harbor to Atglen transmission line replacement, which has already been completed.

The Zoo to Paoli transmission line would replace the current supply scheme which uses 138 kV lines which run circuitously along the SEPTA Cynwyd Line, the Schuylkill Branch rail-trails and the Trenton Cut-off between the Zoo and Frazer substations. The new routing will reduce maintenance costs, as Amtrak must maintain transmission poles and control vegetation along right-of-way which it neither owns nor uses for revenue service. The conceptual line will run from the existing Paoli substation to the junction of the Harrisburg to Philadelphia main line and SEPTA's Cynwyd Line at 52nd Street in West Philadelphia. .

The new lines would connect to the existing 1ED and 2ED circuits, which would be abandoned between the junction and their current terminus at the Earnest Junction HT Switch. The plan also includes construction of a 138/12 kV substation at Bryn Mawr to replace the existing switching station. The existing 1915 catenary structures are planned for replacement, and new transmission supports will be compatible with catenary replacement. However, none of this was done due to local opposition.

Hamilton substation project 
A new substation (Number 34A) called Hamilton was constructed in Mercer County, NJ. Work on the site began in early 2013, and the substation sap put into service in early 2015.

Morton and Lenni 
The Morton #01 and Lenni #02 substations are owned by SEPTA and supply the Media/Wawa Line; therefore, they are not covered by Amtrak capital funding programs. SEPTA's own capital improvement plan, formulated in late 2013 after passage of funding legislation in Pennsylvania, allowed for the renewal of all components at Morton and Lenni.

Lenni
In October 2014 SEPTA requested interested contractors to submit bids for the rehabilitation of Lenni substation. In December 2014 SEPTA awarded a $6.82 million contract to Vanalt Electrical for the work. The work was completed by the end of fall 2016.

Morton
In February 2014 SEPTA awarded a $6.62 million contract to Philips Brothers Electrical Contractors Inc. for the rehabilitation of Morton substation. The work was completed by the end of fall 2016.

Recent problems
Despite the recent capital improvements throughout the system, several high-profile power failures have occurred along the NEC in recent years.

May 26, 2006 Blackout
On May 25, 2006, during restoration from maintenance on one of the Richmond inverter modules, a command to restore the module to full output capability was not executed. The system tolerated this reduced capacity for about 36 hours, during which time the problem went unnoticed. During rush hour the next morning (May 26), the overall capacity became overloaded:

 At 7:55 am, the two Jericho Park converter breakers tripped.
 Shortly after, the Sunnyside converter tripped.
 At 8:02 am, three of the Richmond converter modules breakers tripped. A fourth tripped shortly afterward. After the fourth Richmond breaker tripped, the system began to destabilize. Human operators recognized the impending system damage and manually tripped the remaining power supplies, shutting down the entire 25 Hz network.

By 8:03 am, the entire 25 Hz system, stretching from Washington, D.C. to Queens, New York, was shut down. About 52,000 people were stranded on trains or otherwise affected. Two New Jersey Transit trains stranded under the Hudson River were retrieved by diesel locomotives. Restoration was hampered by policies which allowed the converter stations to operate unattended during rush hour periods. The 25 Hz system was restored by a 'black start' using the Safe Harbor water turbines, and most service along the system returned to normal by mid-afternoon. Amtrak subsequently improved its system of maintaining 'rescue' diesel locomotives near the Hudson River tunnels.

December 23, 2009 Brownout
Low system voltage around New York City caused a halt of trains in and around the New York area at 8:45 am on Wednesday, December 23, 2009. Power was never fully lost, and full voltage was restored by 11:30 am. Amtrak stated that an electrical problem in North Bergen, New Jersey (near the western portal and the Union City substation) caused the problem, but did not further elaborate on the nature of the malfunction.

August 24, 2010 Brownout
Low system voltages beginning at 7:45 am on Tuesday, August 24, 2010, caused Amtrak to order an essentially system-wide stoppage of trains within the 25 Hz traction network. Slow-speed service was gradually restored, and the power problem was corrected by 9:00 am, although delays persisted the remainder of the morning.

October–November 2012: Hurricane Sandy

On October 29, 2012, Hurricane Sandy struck the northeast coast of the U.S. Augmented by a nor'easter, the storm surge from Sandy raced through the Hackensack Meadows, severely damaging (among other railroad infrastructure) Kearney Substation #41 and knocking it offline. This loss of electrical capacity forced Amtrak and New Jersey Transit to operate fewer trains, using modified weekend schedules. With assistance from the U.S. Army Corps of Engineers, the substation was isolated from floodwaters and then dewatered. After testing the substation's components, the degree of damage was determined to be less than initially feared, and after further repairs, Kearney Substation came back on-line on Friday, November 16, allowing the immediate return of all Amtrak and gradual return of all NJ Transit electric trains into Penn Station through the dewatered North River Tunnels.

Amtrak has since requested federal funding to upgrade Kearny substation so it is high enough to not be affected by flood water.

See also
 25 kV AC railway electrification
 Amtrak's 60 Hz traction power system operates along the northern portions of the Northeast Corridor from New Haven to Boston
 Electrification of the New York, New Haven, and Hartford Railroad, electrification between New York and New Haven.
 SEPTA's 25 Hz traction power system, also used by commuter trains in the Philadelphia area. 
 List of railway electrification systems
 Railroad electrification in the United States

Footnotes

References

 
 
 
 
  Retrieved from Google Books
 "The Electrification of the Pennsylvania Railroad from Broad Street Terminal Philadelphia to Paoli", The Electric Journal, Vol 12, pp. 536–541, Pittsburgh, PA: 1915. Retrieved from Google Books November 10, 2010.
 
 . A good general overview of the 1930s electrification, written while most of the main line was complete, but work was still ongoing.
 
  Provides a good discussion on the design decisions related to the Ivy City substation. Good plan view of the substation and breaker and transmission line designations.
 
 Reply Testimony of Stanley R. Forczek, August 28, 2009. Case Number 9173. Retrieved August 15, 2010.
  Retrieved from Google Books on November 12, 2010.

 "Pennsylvania Station, New York Terminal Service Plant, 250 West Thirty-first Street, New York, New York, NY", Historic American Buildings Survey, Survey Number HABS NY,31-NEYO,78A-, retrieved from the Library of Congress September 1, 2011.
 
 
 New York Edison Company, Powerhouse, 686-700 First Avenue, New York, New York, NY, Historic American Buildings Survey, Survey HABS NY,31-NEYO,159A-, retrieved from the Library of Congress on January 31, 2011.
 

25
Electric power distribution
Railway electrification in the United States
Electric railways in the United States
Electric power transmission systems in the United States
Traction power networks